Przemysław Noworyta is a Polish former competitive figure skater. He is a three-time Polish national champion (1987–89) and competed at the European Championships in 1987 and 1988. He was coached by Iwona Mydlarz-Chruścińska in southern Poland.

Competitive highlights

References 

Polish male single skaters
Living people
Sportspeople from Katowice
Year of birth missing (living people)